The Z.C.B.J. Rad Tabor No. 74, also known as Tabor Hall, is an historic building located south of Dorchester in rural Saline County, Nebraska.  It was built in 1914; a large dance pavilion was added in 1934. It was listed on the National Register of Historic Places on August 23, 1985. It historically served as a meeting hall for the Czech community, hosting Czech language classes and Sokol events.

It is ventilated by a "unique system of six-paned casement windows and lap-sided panels which hinge horizontally".

See also
 Zapadni Ceska Bratrska Jednota
 Czech-Slovak Protective Society

References

Western Fraternal Life Association
Czech-American culture in Nebraska
Clubhouses on the National Register of Historic Places in Nebraska
Buildings and structures in Saline County, Nebraska
Sokol in the United States
Buildings and structures completed in 1914
National Register of Historic Places in Saline County, Nebraska